Undertrial (Hindi: अन्डरट्रायल) is a 2007 Bollywood crime drama film directed by Aziz Khan.

Plot
Sagar Hussain is in jail as an "under trial" prisoner. Sagar's wife Sabeena (Monica Castelino) was proved to be a prostitute who with the help of her associate put their daughters in the flesh trade. When the elder one resisted due to a call of humanity, they murdered her. Incidentally the murder scene got recorded in daughter's  mobile phone. The film ends with Sagar released from the jail after being respectfully exonerated by the honourable court of law.

Cast 
 Rajpal Yadav as Sagar Hussain
 Monica Castelino as Sabeena Begum
 Kader Khan as Advocate Ravi Vishnoi
 Prem Chopra as Public Prosecutor Anand Verma
 Rajesh Puri as Advocate Apte
 Mukesh Tiwari as Nadir Saab
 Pratima Kazmi as Justice Jaya Reddy
 Javed Rizvi as Tirput
 Sambhavna Sheth
 Sunil Rege
 Mukesh Bhatt
 Ravi Jhankal
 Firdaus Mewawala
 Nafisa Khan
 Ghanashyam Nayak as Nattu Jamuddia

Music
 "Kaga Tikulia Le Bhaga" – Anaida
 "Ke Sath" – Sudesh Bhosle
 "Koi Kahe Magan" – Krishna Kalle
 "Lo Gaya Kaam Se" – Sonu Nigam, Alka Yagnik

References

External links
 

2007 films
2000s Hindi-language films
Films scored by Anu Malik
Indian films based on actual events
Films scored by Shamir Tandon